Michael Brandt (born 27 June 1976) is a Swedish modern pentathlete. He competed in the men's individual event at the 2000 Summer Olympics.

References

External links
 

1976 births
Living people
Swedish male modern pentathletes
Olympic modern pentathletes of Sweden
Modern pentathletes at the 2000 Summer Olympics
Sportspeople from Stockholm